HD 200375 is a binary star system in the equatorial constellation of Aquarius. Their orbit does not yet have a unique solution available.

References

External links
 Image HD 200375

Aquarius (constellation)
200375
Double stars
F-type main-sequence stars
8056
103892
Durchmusterung objects